is a Japanese footballer currently playing as a midfielder for Tochigi SC, as a designated special player.

Career statistics

Club
.

Notes

References

External links

1999 births
Living people
People from Utsunomiya, Tochigi
Association football people from Tochigi Prefecture
National Institute of Fitness and Sports in Kanoya alumni
Japanese footballers
Association football midfielders
J2 League players
Tochigi SC players